Clyde railway station may refer to:

Clyde railway station, Sydney
Clyde railway station, Victoria